= Katiperi =

Village in Chittoor District, India

Coordinates: 13.4194°N 78.6171°E

Katiperi is a village in Chowdepalli mandal, Chittoor district, Andhra Pradesh, India.
